Bottegoa insignis is a species of plant in the family Sapindaceae. It is found in Ethiopia, Kenya, and Somalia. It is threatened by habitat loss.

References

insignis
Near threatened plants
Taxonomy articles created by Polbot